Zuyena is a rural locality (a village) in Shapshinskoye Rural Settlement, Kharovsky District, Vologda Oblast, Russia. The population was 14 as of 2002.

Geography 
Zuyena is located 40 km northwest of Kharovsk (the district's administrative centre) by road. Mashutikha is the nearest rural locality.

References 

Rural localities in Kharovsky District